The vice chairpersons of the Standing Committee of the National People's Congress are deputies to the chairman of the Standing Committee of the National People's Congress, responsible with assisting the chairman in his work. Since 1982, vice chairpersons are appointed for a term of five years, and cannot serve for more than two terms, just as with the Deputy Speaker of the Chinese Parliament.

List of vice chairpersons

Current

Historical

See also 

 Standing Committee of the National People's Congress
 Council of Chairpersons
 Chairman
 Secretary-General
 National Committee of the Chinese People's Political Consultative Conference
 Vice Chairpersons

 
1954 establishments in China
Members of the Standing Committee of the National People's Congress